The Caproni Ca.3 is an Italian heavy bomber of World War I and the postwar era. It was the most produced version of the series of aircraft that began with the 1914 Caproni Ca.1 and continued until the more powerful 1917 Caproni Ca.5 variant.

Development

The development of the Ca.1 to the Ca.2 suggested the benefits of increasing amounts of power to the very sound airframe. The Ca.3 was a development of Ca.2, by replacing the two engines mounted on the booms with the same Isotta-Fraschini engine that had been used as the central, pusher engine on that design. The prototype flew in late 1916 and was soon put into production. Known by Caproni at the time as the Caproni 450 hp, the Italian Army designated it the Ca.3. In Caproni's postwar renaming, it became the Ca.33. Between 250 and 300 of these aircraft were built, supplying the Italian Army and Navy (the latter using the type as a torpedo bomber), and the French Army. Late in the war, Robert Esnault-Pelterie licence-built an additional 83 (some sources say only 19) aircraft in France.

Note: there is some variation in published sources over early Caproni names. The confusion stems, in part, from three schemes used to label the aircraft – Caproni's in-house designations of the time, those used by the Italian Army and names created after the war by Caproni for past designs.

Design
The Ca.3 was a three-engined biplane of wooden construction, with a fabric-covered frame. The crew of four were placed in an open central nacelle (front gunner, two pilots and rear gunner-mechanic). The rear gunner manned upper machine guns, standing upon the central engine in a protective "cage" in front of a propeller. The fixed conventional undercarriage had double mainwheels under each engine and a tailskid under the extreme tail of each boom.  A substantial double nosewheel prevented damaging and dangerous noseovers.

Armament consisted of two to four Revelli 6.5 mm or 7.7 mm machine guns, one in a front ring mount and one, two or sometimes even three in an upper ring mount. Bombs were suspended under the hull.

Operational history

The Ca.1 entered service with the Italian Army in the middle of 1915 and first saw action on 20 August, attacking the Austrian air base at Aisovizza. Fifteen bomber squadrons (1°–15° Squadriglia) were eventually equipped with Ca.1, Ca.2 and Ca.3 bombers, mostly bombing targets in Austro-Hungary. The 12° Squadriglie operated in Libya. In 1918, the 3°, 14° and 15° Squadriglia operated in France.

Apart from the Italian Army, original and licence-built examples were used by France (original Capronis were used in French CAP escadres, licence-built examples in CEP escadres). They were also used by the American Expeditionary Force. There has been some confusion regarding the use of the Ca3 by the British Royal Naval Air Service. The RNAS received six of the larger triplane Ca4s and did not operate the Ca3. The British Ca4s were not used operationally and were returned to Italy after the war. Some of the Ca.36Ms supplied after the war were still in service long enough to see action in Benito Mussolini's first assaults on North Africa.

Variants
All of the following names were applied after the war. At the time, all were known as the 300 hp by Caproni and the Ca.3 by the Army.

Ca.34 and Ca.35 with a modified central nacelle to seat the two pilots in tandem and therefore improve aerodynamics. No production.
 Ca.36 with removable outer wing panels for ease of storage.
 Ca.36M or Ca.36 mod (for modificato – "modified") – a lightened and simplified variant put into production after the war. 153 were delivered between 1923 and 1927, 144 of them to the new Regia Aeronautica.
 Ca.36S – air ambulance version (small number converted from Ca.36Ms)
 Ca.39 – seaplane version. Prototype CA 211.
 Ca.56a – airliners created by remanufacturing war-surplus Ca.3s.

Operators

Argentine Air Force

Corpo Aeronautico Militare
Regia Aeronautica

French Air Force

American Expeditionary Force

Surviving aircraft and replicas

Italy 

 Unknown ID – Ca.36 on static display at the Italian Air Force Museum in Bracciano, Lazio.
 Airworthy Replica Ca.3 based near Venice

Slovakia 

 Reproduction – Ca.33 on static display since June 2012 in the departure hall of M. R. Štefánik Airport in Bratislava, on loan from the Vojenské historické muzeum in Piešťany, Trnava.

United States 

 Unknown ID – Ca.36 on static display at the National Museum of the United States Air Force in Dayton, Ohio.

Specifications (Ca.36)

See also

References

External links

 Aircraft of the AEF – Caproni Ca.3
 Aerei Italiani (Italian)

Ca.003
1910s Italian bomber aircraft
Military aircraft of World War I
Three-engined push-pull aircraft
Twin-boom aircraft
Biplanes
Aircraft first flown in 1916